Zoltán Medgyes (born 23 July 1995) is a Hungarian football player who plays for Gyirmót. He was also part of the Hungarian U-19 at the 2014 UEFA European Under-19 Championship.

Club statistics

Updated to games played as of 15 October 2014.

References

External links
MLSZ 
HLSZ 

1995 births
Living people
Sportspeople from Pest County
Hungarian footballers
Hungary youth international footballers
Association football midfielders
Szombathelyi Haladás footballers
Mezőkövesdi SE footballers
Dorogi FC footballers
BFC Siófok players
Gyirmót FC Győr players
Nemzeti Bajnokság I players
Nemzeti Bajnokság II players